Schismatogobius deraniyagalai, the redneck goby, is a species of goby native to India and Sri Lanka. This species inhabits river shallows, where it prefers areas with substrates that range from sand to gravel in which it can hide when threatened. It can also be found in the aquarium trade. The specific name honours the Sri Lankan paleontologist and zoologist Paul E. P. Deraniyagala (1900-1976) for his contribution to the natural history of Sri Lanka.

References

Schismatogobius
Taxonomy articles created by Polbot
Fish described in 1989